Diamond Community Ground is a cricket ground in Diamond, Guyana.

History
Located adjacent to the Demerara River in the town of Diamond, the ground has played host as a neutral venue to one List A one-day match between Antigua and Barbuda and the Southern Windward Islands in the 2001–02 Red Stripe Bowl. In a match which Antigua and Barbuda won by 79 runs, with the best performances in the match coming from Antigua and Barbuda players: Dave Joseph top-scoring with the bat with 74 runs and Wilden Cornwall taking 4 for 40 with the ball.

See also
List of cricket grounds in the West Indies

References

External links
Diamond Community Ground at ESPNcricinfo

Cricket grounds in Guyana
Football venues in Guyana